The 2008 World Outdoor Bowls Championship men's singles was held at the Burnside Bowling Club in Christchurch, New Zealand, from 12 to 24 January 2008.

Safuan Said won the men's singles Gold.

Bizarrely, there is confusion as to the actual Brunei team that competed. Although HJ Brahim Naim is listed as competing in the singles and pairs he publicly announced that he was not there after missing his flight.

Section tables

Section A

Section B

Finals

Results

References

Men